Nivaldo may refer to:
 Nivaldo (name)
 Nivaldo (footballer, born 1974), born José Nivaldo Martins Constante, Brazilian football goalkeeper
 Nivaldo (footballer, born 1975), born Nivaldo Lourenço da Silva, Brazilian football midfielder
 Nivaldo (footballer, born 1977), born Nivaldo Vieira Lima, Brazilian football defensive midfielder
 Nivaldo (footballer, born 1980), born Nivaldo Batista Santana, Brazilian football centre-back
 Nivaldo (footballer, born June 1988), born Nivaldo Rodrigues Ferreira, Brazilian football striker
 Nivaldo (footballer, born July 1988), born Nivaldo Alves Freitas Santos, Cape Verdean football left midfielder